Peter Carlesimo may refer to:

 Peter A. Carlesimo (1915–2003), American football player, coach and college athletics administrator
 P. J. Carlesimo (born 1949), American basketball coach